Minuscule 407 (in the Gregory-Aland numbering), ε 320 (in Soden's numbering), is a Greek minuscule manuscript of the New Testament, on parchment. Paleographically it has been assigned to the 12th century. 
It contains marginalia.

Description 

The codex contains the text of the Gospel of Luke 5:30-Gospel of John 9:2 on 87 parchment leaves. The text is written in one column per page, in 21 lines per page.

There is also a division according to the Ammonian Sections, but references to the Eusebian Canons are absent.

Text 

The Greek text of the codex is a representative of the Byzantine text-type. Hermann von Soden classified it to the textual family Kx. Aland placed it in Category V.

According to the Claremont Profile Method it represents Kx in Luke 10 and Luke 20. In Luke 1 its text is defective.

The Pericope Adulterae (John 7:53-8:11) is marked with an obelus.

History 

Wiedmann and J. G. J. Braun collated portions of the manuscript for Scholz (1794-1852). The manuscript was added to the list of New Testament manuscripts by Scholz. 
C. R. Gregory saw the manuscript in 1886.

The manuscript is currently housed at the Biblioteca Marciana (Gr. I. 12) in Venice.

See also 

 List of New Testament minuscules
 Biblical manuscript
 Textual criticism

References

Further reading 

 

Greek New Testament minuscules
12th-century biblical manuscripts